Chris Chapman (born ) is a former professional rugby league footballer who played in the 1980s and 1990s.

Playing career

County Cup Final appearances
Chris Chapman played , i.e. number 5, (replaced by interchange/substitute David Roockley) in Castleford's 12–33 defeat by Leeds in the 1988 Yorkshire County Cup Final during the 1988–89 season at Headingley Rugby Stadium, Leeds on Sunday 16 October 1988.

References

External links
Statistics at rugbyleagueproject.org (incorrectly includes statistics of the rugby league footballer who played in the 1990s and 2000s for; Leeds, Sheffield Eagles, and Dewsbury Rams)
Chris Chapman Memory Box Search at archive.castigersheritage.com

1966 births
Living people
Castleford Tigers players
Dewsbury Rams players
English rugby league players
Huddersfield Giants players
Leeds Rhinos players
Rugby league wingers
Rugby articles needing expert attention
Sheffield Eagles players